The Wasserman radar was an early-warning radar built by Germany during World War II. The radar was a development of FuMG 80 Freya and was operated during World War II for long range detection. It was developed under the direction of Theodor Schultes, beginning in 1942. Wasserman was based on largely unchanged Freya electronics, but used an entirely new antenna array in order to improve range, height-finding and bearing precision.

Development 

Seven different versions were developed. The two most important versions are:
 The radio measurement equipment FuMG.41 Wassermann L (German: Leicht = light) was a constellation of four Freya antennas on top of each other, mounted on a  rotatable steel lattice mast.
 A later version was the FuMG.42 Wassermann S (German: Schwer = heavy). For this eight Freya antenna arrays were mounted on a  pipe mast in two columns, each four antennae high.

The combination of the antennae in this way resulted in a concentration of the radiated energy to a smaller beam, thus resulting in a higher radiated power in the main direction (Effective Radiated Power = ERP) without increasing the transmitter power. The result was a longer range. With the L-version the horizontal opening angle of the antenna array remained the same, but the vertical opening angle was reduced (so flatter radiation pattern). Because the horizontal opening angle was not changed, the bearing measuring performance was not changed. With the S-version also the horizontal opening angle was reduced, resulting in a better bearing resolution.

Technical Info 

 Search bearing: mechanical rotation of 360°
 Range: depending on target altitude and station altitude, e.g.:
Target altitude Range
50 m    35 km
6,000 m   190 km
 Range accuracy: +/−300 m
 Detection accuracy:
• Bearing: +/−°
• Altitude: +/−° (in the range of 3–18°)
• Altitude detection possible
 Detection possibly up to 12,000 m
 Mass: 30–60 t
 Seize: Height of mast: 37–57 m
 Width 6–12, 40 m
 Jamming resisted due to three different frequency ranges:
• 1.9–2.5 m
• 1.2–1.9 m
• 2.4–4.0 m
 Detection of Friend or Foe in cooperation with the FuG.25a Erstling equipment.

References

Bibliography

World War II German radars
Radar networks
Military equipment introduced from 1940 to 1944